Libor Pimek was the defending champion, but lost in the second round this year.

Joakim Nyström won the title, defeating Hans Schwaier 6–1, 6–0 in the final.

Seeds

  Andrés Gómez (first round)
  Joakim Nyström (champion)
  Libor Pimek (second round)
  Miloslav Mečíř (quarterfinals)
  Juan Aguilera (second round)
  José Luis Clerc (semifinals)
  Jan Gunnarsson (first round)
  Hans Schwaier (final)

Draw

Finals

Top half

Bottom half

External links
 1985 BMW Open draw

Singles